Poly(propylene glycol) diglycidyl ether (PPGDGE) is an organic chemical in the glycidyl ether family. There are a number of variations depending on the starting molecular weight of the polypropylene glycol. They have the formula (C3H6O)n.C6H10O3 and the IUPAC name is Poly[oxy(methyl-1,2-ethanediyl)],a-(2-oxiranylmethyl)-w-(2-oxiranylmethoxy)-  A key use is as a modifier for epoxy resins as a reactive diluent and flexibilizer. It is REACH registered.

Manufacturing
The product is made by taking polypropylene glycol and epichlorohydrin and reacting in the presence of a Lewis acid catalyst to form a halohydrin. The next step is dehydrochlorination with sodium hydroxide. This forms the diglycidyl ether. Waste products are sodium chloride, water and excess sodium hydroxide (alkaline brine). One of the quality control tests would involve measuring the epoxy value by determination of the epoxy equivalent weight.

Use
The molecule has 2 oxirane functionalities, and so a key use is modifying and reducing the viscosity of epoxy resins. These reactive diluent modified epoxy resins may then be further formulated into CASE applications: coatings, adhesives, sealants, and elastomers. It produces epoxy coatings with high impact resistance. The use of the diluent does effect mechanical properties and microstructure of epoxy resins.

Synthesis of waterborne polymers has been a feature with this substance. As the basic building block is propylene oxide, there are 3 carbons per oxygen on the backbone. This confers some degree of water miscibility though not as good as ethylene oxide based molecules.

The material maybe used to produce polymers with shape memory and good thermomechanical properties. In addition, the molecule is used to synthesize other molecules.

Toxicology
The toxicology of the material is reasonably well known.

See also
 Epoxide
 Glycidol

Further reading

References

Reactive diluents
Glycidyl ethers

External websites
 AALCHEM DE209
 Cargill Reactive Diluents
 Chinese produced material